John Calvin Owings House is a historic home located at Laurens, Laurens County, South Carolina. It was designed by architect George Franklin Barber and built in 1896.  It is a -story, Queen Anne style frame dwelling. It features high multiple roofs, turrets, oriels, cresting, turned spindles, and porches. The projecting front gable includes a decorated second-story portico.  Also on the property are four contributing outbuildings.

It was added to the National Register of Historic Places in 1978.

References

External links 

 
 

Historic American Buildings Survey in South Carolina
Houses on the National Register of Historic Places in South Carolina
Queen Anne architecture in South Carolina
Houses completed in 1896
Houses in Laurens County, South Carolina
National Register of Historic Places in Laurens County, South Carolina